Wadham Stringer was an English ambulance and bus manufacturer.

History

Wadham Stringer was formed when Wadham merged with Stringer Motors in 1968. It was a distributor for Morris cars and British Leyland commercial vehicles. It also was an Austin, Jaguar, MG and Wolseley franchisee. In 1972 it acquired Portsmouth based bodybuilder Sparshatt Group.

In 1979, the business was sold to Tozer Kemsley & Millbourn. In 1993, it was purchased by Universal Vehicle Group.

After being placed in administration, the factory was acquired by Salvador Caetano in 1998.

References

External links

Auto dealerships of the United Kingdom
Coachbuilders of the United Kingdom